The 2019 season was the Pittsburgh Steelers' 87th season as a professional sports franchise and as a member of the National Football League (NFL). It marked the 20th season under leadership of general manager Kevin Colbert and the 13th under head coach Mike Tomlin.  The team failed to improve upon its 9–6–1 record from 2018 following a Week 16 loss to the New York Jets.

For the first time since 2013, they started the season with a 1–4 record through Week 5, which included a 33–3 opening loss to the defending Super Bowl champion New England Patriots, and an injury to Ben Roethlisberger the very next game. However, they went on to win seven out of their next eight games to reach Week 14 of the season with an 8–5 record before losing three consecutive games to end the 2019 season with an 8–8 record and missed the playoffs for the second straight season. They also tied for their worst record (2006, 2012, 2013) since the 2003 season.

For the first time since 2009, wide receiver Antonio Brown was not on the roster, as he was traded to the Oakland Raiders on March 9, 2019.

Transactions
The Steelers were involved in the following transactions during the 2019 season:

Trades

Free agent signings

Cuts

Roster moves
Several players who played significant roles in the Steelers' recent success did not return for 2019. Among the departed were:
Offensive tackle Marcus Gilbert, traded to the Arizona Cardinals on March 8, 2019 for the Cardinals compensatory 6th round pick, used on Ulysees Gilbert III.
Wide receiver Antonio Brown, traded to the Oakland Raiders on March 9, 2019 for the Raiders 3rd and 5th round picks in the 2019 NFL Draft, used to select Diontae Johnson and Zach Gentry, respectively.
Running back Le'Veon Bell, who signed with the New York Jets on March 13, 2019.
Tight end Jesse James, who signed with the Detroit Lions on March 14, 2019.

Several of these moves were made in the name of eliminating "distractions", namely from Brown and Bell. Brown had several clashes with the coaching staff, sports media and teammates (most notably Ben Roethlisberger and JuJu Smith-Schuster) and was subsequently benched in the Steelers season finale against the Cincinnati Bengals, which led to Brown demanding a trade. Bell had been tagged with the franchise tag the previous two seasons and sat out the 2018 season; the Steelers opted not to tag him for a third time due to salary cap constraints as well as the emergence of fan favorite James Conner and Bell subsequently signed with the Jets for less than what the Steelers had offered him. Gilbert was injured for much of 2018 and was made expendable due to the emergence of Matt Feiler in his spot. James, initially groomed to be the heir replacement to Heath Miller, ultimately remained a backup after the Steelers traded for Vance McDonald.

In addition to the players traded away and cut, Ryan Shazier remained out due to his 2017 spinal injury against the Bengals. After struggling to fill his role during the 2018 campaign, the Steelers addressed his long-term absence by going to the other side of the Michigan–Ohio State football rivalry by trading up in the 2019 draft to draft Michigan linebacker Devin Bush Jr. Shazier was subsequently placed on the reserve/PUP list for the 2019 season.

Draft

Notes

Pittsburgh traded their 2019 fifth-round selection to Oakland in exchange for wide receiver Ryan Switzer and Oakland's sixth-round selection.
Pittsburgh traded their 2019 seventh-round selection and wide receiver Sammie Coates to Cleveland in exchange for Cleveland's 2018 sixth-round selection that originally belonged to Pittsburgh.
Pittsburgh traded their 2018 sixth-round selection to Tampa Bay in exchange for their 2019 seventh-round selection and free safety J. J. Wilcox.
Pittsburgh traded right tackle Marcus Gilbert to Arizona in exchange for a 2019 sixth-round compensatory selection.
Pittsburgh traded wide receiver Antonio Brown to Oakland in exchange for Oakland's third round selection and their fifth-round selection.

Undrafted free agents
All undrafted free agents were signed after the 2019 NFL draft concluded on April 26 unless otherwise noted.

Staff

Final roster

Preseason

Regular season

Schedule
The Steelers, along with the rest of the NFL, unveiled their schedule on April 17. The team released a video on social media unveiling their schedule by using the Neighborhood of Make-Believe from Mister Rogers' Neighborhood in honor of Pittsburgh native Fred Rogers. Longtime radio play-by-play announcer Bill Hillgrove did the voiceover, referring to the Steelers division rivals as their "neighbors", their Thursday night game as "speedy delivery" (in honor of Mr. McFeely), their three West Coast games as "traveling to a far-away land", and the series' closing theme to reference the team's bye week. The Steelers received critical acclaim by both USA Today and the Pittsburgh Tribune-Review for honoring Rogers.

Note: Divisional opponents are in bold text.

Game summaries

Week 1: at New England Patriots

The Steelers started their season on the road against the Patriots. The Patriots scored first, 10 minutes into the opening quarter, when Tom Brady found Josh Gordon on a 20-yard touchdown pass to make it 7–0 for the only score of the period. They made it 10–0 in the second quarter when Stephen Gostkowski kicked a 25-yard field goal. This was followed up by Brady connecting with Philip Dorsett on a 25-yard touchdown pass to make it 17–0, before Gostkowski kicked a 41-yard field goal to make it 20–0 at halftime. In the third quarter, the Steelers managed to get on the board when Chris Boswell kicked a 19-yard field goal to make it 20–3. However, Brady and Dorsett connected again on a 58-yard touchdown pass to make it 27–3. This was followed up by Gostkowski kicking a 35-yard field goal to put the Pats up 30–3. In the fourth quarter, the Pats scored the only three points with Gostkowski's fourth field goal of the game to make the eventual final score 33–3.

With the loss, the Steelers started 0–1.

Week 2: vs. Seattle Seahawks

The Steelers opened their season at home against the Seahawks. After a scoreless first quarter, the Steelers scored first in the second when James Conner ran for a 1-yard touchdown to make it 7–0. The Seahawks tied it up when QB Russell Wilson found Will Dissly on a 14-yard pass to make it 7–7. Though, the Steelers would retake the lead at halftime when Chris Boswell kicked a 41-yard field goal to make it 10–7. Wilson and Dissley connected again in the third quarter on a 12-yard pass to make it 14–10, though the Steelers later came within a point after Boswell kicked a 33-yard field goal to make it 14–13. The Seahawks pulled away when Rashaad Penny ran for a 37-yard touchdown to make it 21–13. In the fourth quarter, the Steelers came within 2 when backup QB Mason Rudolph found TE Vance McDonald on an 8-yard pass (with a failed two-point conversion) to make it 21–19. The Seahawks responded as Wilson found DK Metcalf on a 28-yard pass to make it 28–19. The Steelers scored the final points of the game with Rudolph again connecting with McDonald from three yards out to make the final score 28–26.

With the loss, the Steelers fell to 0–2, their first such start since 2013. Longtime franchise QB Ben Roethlisberger was also ruled out for the season after suffering a non-contact elbow injury during the game.

Week 3: at San Francisco 49ers

After a tough loss at home, the Steelers headed back on the road for a game against the 49ers. In the first quarter, it was all Steelers when Chris Boswell kicked two field goals from 46 and 26 yards out to make it 6–0. The Niners got on the board when Robbie Gould kicked a 24-yard field goal in the second to make it 6–3 at halftime. In the third quarter, the Niners took the lead when Jeff Wilson ran for a 1-yard touchdown to make it 10–6, though the Steelers retook the lead when Mason Rudolph found JuJu Smith-Schuster on a 79-yard pass to make it 13–10. The Niners retook the lead later on in the quarter when Wilson ran for a 4-yard touchdown to make it 17–13. In the fourth quarter, Rudolph found Diontae Johnson on a 39-yard pass to retake the lead 20–17. Though, the Niners ended up winning the game when Jimmy Garoppolo found Dante Pettis on a 5-yard pass for a final score of 24–20.

With the loss, the Steelers fell to 0–3 for the first time since 2013.

Week 4: vs. Cincinnati Bengals

After another tough loss, the Steelers returned home for a Monday Night Football duel against the Bengals. In the first quarter, the Bengals scored first, when Randy Bullock kicked a 28-yard field goal to make it 3–0 for the quarter's only score. However, it would be all Steelers from the second quarter onwards when they scored 27 consecutive points to seal the game and get their first win.

With the win—their ninth straight over the Bengals—the Steelers improved to 1–3.

Week 5: vs. Baltimore Ravens

After a huge win at home against the Bengals, the Steelers stayed at home for another AFC North duel against the Ravens. In the first quarter, the Ravens went up 3–0 after Justin Tucker kicked a 27-yard field goal. They made it 10–0 after Mark Ingram II ran for a 4-yard touchdown, but the Steelers pulled it back to 10–7 after Mason Rudolph found JuJu Smith-Schuster for a 35-yard touchdown pass. In the second quarter, the Ravens pulled back ahead by double-digits as Marquise Brown caught an 11-yard pass from Lamar Jackson to make it 17–7, but a pair of Chris Boswell field goals from 41 and 29 yards out made it 17–13 going into halftime. The Steelers took the lead in the third quarter when James Conner ran for a 1-yard touchdown to make it 20–17 for the quarter's only score. In the fourth quarter, the Ravens tied it up when Tucker kicked a 26-yard field goal to make it 20–20. The Steelers retook the lead on a 33-yard Boswell field goal to make it 23–20, but the Ravens were able to force overtime when Tucker hit a 48-yard field goal with 10 seconds left in regulation to tie the scores at 23–23. In overtime, the Ravens capitalized on a fumble by Smith-Schuster by nudging into field goal range to allow Tucker to kick the game-winning 46-yarder.

With the loss, the Steelers fell to 1–4.

Week 6: at Los Angeles Chargers

After losing to the Ravens at home, the Steelers traveled west to take on the Chargers in a Sunday Night duel. The Steelers led 24–0 going into the fourth quarter, only for the Chargers to score 17 unanswered points, putting them a touchdown away from tying the game with less than 90 seconds remaining. Although they failed with their onside kick attempt, they forced the Steelers to go three-and-out on their ensuing possession, giving QB Philip Rivers the opportunity to attempt a 99-yard, game-winning drive; however, he was picked off by CB Cameron Sutton, allowing the Steelers to kneel out the clock for a 24–17 win.

With the win, the Steelers went into their bye week at 2–4, and with the Browns' loss to the Seahawks earlier in the day, they moved into a tie for second place in the AFC North.

Week 8: vs. Miami Dolphins

Coming off their bye week, the Steelers returned home for a Monday Night Football game against the Dolphins.  The Dolphins jumped out to a 14–0 lead in the first quarter, but from the second quarter onwards, it would be all Steelers as they put up 27 unanswered points to seal the victory.

With the win, the Steelers improved to 3–4.

Week 9: vs. Indianapolis Colts

The Steelers stayed home for a game against the Colts. In the first quarter, the Colts scored first when Adam Vinatieri kicked a 25-yard field goal to make it 3–0.  The Steelers tied it up when Chris Boswell kicked a 21-yard field goal to make it 3–3.  In the second quarter, the Colts moved back into the lead when Brian Hoyer found Jack Doyle on an 11-yard pass to make it 10–3.  Though, the Steelers tied the game up again when Minkah Fitzpatrick returned an interception 96 yards for a touchdown to make it 10–10.  The Colts regained the lead when Hoyer found Zach Pascal on a 14-yard pass (with a failed PAT) to make it 16–10.  The Steelers drew closer when Boswell kicked a 51-yard field goal to make it 16–13 at halftime.  In the third quarter, the Steelers took the lead when Mason Rudolph found Vance McDonald on a 7-yard pass to make it 20–16.  The Colts then came with 2 when Alejandro Villanueva was sacked in the end zone for a safety by Justin Houston, making the score 20–18.  The Steelers moved slightly further ahead in the fourth quarter when Boswell kicked a 33-yard field goal to make it 23–18.  Though, the Colts regained the lead when Chester Rogers caught a 4-yard pass (with a failed 2-point conversion) from Brian Hoyer to make the score 24–23.  Boswell then got the Steelers the lead back when he kicked a 26-yard field goal to make it 26–24.  Getting the ball back with just under 90 seconds left, Vinatieri missed the potential game-winning field goal.  This allowed the Steelers to kneel out for victory.

With the win, the Steelers improved to 4–4.

Week 10: vs. Los Angeles Rams

After a tough home win, the Steelers stayed home for a game against the Rams.  The Rams scored first in the first quarter when Dante Fowler returned a fumble 26 yards for a touchdown to make it 7–0.  The Steelers, however, tied the game up later on in the quarter when Mason Rudolph found James Washington on a 3-yard pass to make it 7–7.  In the second quarter, the Steelers took the lead when Minkah Fitzpatrick returned a fumble 43 yards for a touchdown to make it 14–7 at halftime.  In the third quarter, the Rams drew closer when Greg Zuerlein kicked a 30-yard field goal to make it 14–10.  In the fourth quarter, they came even closer when Aaron Donald sacked Rudolph in the end zone for a safety to make it 14–12.  The Steelers moved slightly further ahead as Chris Boswell kicked a 33-yard field goal.  Going back and forth for the remainder of the quarter, later on, the Rams' defense forced the Steelers to go 3 and out.  However, they had already used up their time outs.  Jared Goff attempted a comeback within the final seconds of the game only to be intercepted by Fitzpatrick sealing the 17–12 win for the Steelers.

With their fourth straight win, the Steelers improved to 5–4.

Week 11: at Cleveland Browns

Coming off the Week 10 win against the Rams, the Steelers traveled to Cleveland to take on the 3–6 Browns.  Baker Mayfield scored the first points on a 1-yard touchdown run in the first quarter.  The next score came in the second quarter, with a 1-yard touchdown catch by Jarvis Landry.  The Steelers struck back in the third quarter with a touchdown completion by Steelers RB Jaylen Samuels, but with an additional touchdown in the fourth quarter by Browns rookie TE Stephen Carlson, Cleveland held off the Steelers for the win.

Despite completing 23 out of 44 pass attempts for 221 yards and a touchdown, Rudolph was sacked four times for 43 lost yards, and was intercepted four times.  Though they had 18 first downs to the Browns' 17, the Steelers failed to convert on three fourth-down opportunities.  Chris Boswell also missed a 44-yard field goal attempt in the first quarter.

A skirmish broke out between the two teams in the closing seconds of the game.  After passing to Trey Edmunds, Steelers QB Mason Rudolph found himself dragged down by Browns defensive end Myles Garrett.  Rudolph shoved Garrett while the two were still on the ground, seemingly unhappy with how he was tackled.   When the two were back on their feet, Garrett ripped off Rudolph's helmet and took a swing, hitting Rudolph on the head with his own helmet before getting pushed away by Steelers guard David DeCastro.  Browns' LB Larry Ogunjobi pushed Rudolph from behind, while Steelers center Maurkice Pouncey retaliated with throwing several punches and kicks at Garrett's head.  After order was restored, Garrett, Ogunjobi, and Pouncey were ejected for their roles in the fight. The next morning, the NFL announced that all three were suspended without pay for their actions. Myles Garrett received a suspension for the remainder of the season and post season and required to apply for reinstatement in 2020. Pouncey was suspended for two games, and Ogunjobi for one game.

With their 4-game winning streak snapped, the Steelers fell to 5–5.

Week 12: at Cincinnati Bengals

After a tough loss, the Steelers traveled southwest for Round 2 against the Bengals. After a scoreless first quarter, the Steelers scored first in the second when Chris Boswell kicked a 26-yard field goal for a 3–0 lead. The Bengals took the lead when Ryan Finley found Tyler Boyd on a 15-yard pass to make it 7–3 at halftime. In the third quarter, the Steelers retook the lead when Devlin Hodges, taking over for an ineffective Mason Rudolph, found James Washington on a 79-yard pass to make it 10–7. The Bengals would tie it up when Randy Bullock kicked a 27-yard field goal to make it 10–10. In the fourth quarter, it was all Steelers as Boswell kicked 2 field goals: from 47 and 26 yards out to make the score 13–10 and then 16–10. Later on, the Bengals defense forced the Steelers to punt. However, Ryan Finley would be sacked and fumbled the ball. The Steelers were able to seal the game on a key run from Benny Snell, Jr. From then on, Hodges would kneel out for the Steelers win.

With the win and tenth straight win over the Bengals, the Steelers improved to 6–5.

Week 13: vs. Cleveland Browns

After another tough win on the road, the Steelers went home for Round 2 against the Browns.  They were considered the underdogs at home against their long time division rivals for the first time since 1989.  In the first quarter, the Browns scored when Austin Seibert kicked a 31-yard field goal to make it 3–0 for the only score.  They made it 10–0 in the second quarter when Baker Mayfield found Kareem Hunt on a 15-yard pass.  The Steelers, however managed to tie the game up before halftime starting with Chris Boswell's 39-yard field goal to make it 10–3 followed by Devlin Hodges finding James Washington on a 30-yard pass to make it 10–10.  In the third quarter, the Steelers took the lead when Benny Snell Jr. ran for a 1-yard touchdown to make it 17–10.  In the fourth quarter, the Steelers moved further ahead when Boswell kicked a 29-yard field goal to make it 20–10.  Seibert got the Browns within a touchdown when he kicked a 34-yard field goal to make it 20–13.  Getting the ball back later on in the quarter, the Browns had an opportunity to drive down the field and tie the game up.  However, Steelers CB and former Brown Joe Haden came up with the game-winning interception sealing the game for the Steelers.

With the win, the Steelers improved to 7–5.

Week 14: at Arizona Cardinals

After a tough home win, the Steelers travelled to Phoenix, Arizona to take on the Cardinals in a rematch of Super Bowl XLIII. In the first quarter, the Steelers made it 3–0 when Chris Boswell kicked a 30-yard field goal.  They made it 10–0 when Diontae Johnson returned a punt 85 yards for a touchdown.  In the second quarter, the Cards tied the game up when Zane Gonzalez kicked a 30-yard field goal to make it 10–3, followed up by Kyler Murray connecting with Charles Clay on a 5-yard pass to make it 10–10.  The Steelers retook the lead before halftime when Boswell kicked on a 37-yard field goal to make it 13–10.  The Steelers increased their lead in the third quarter when Devlin Hodges found Johnson on a 2-yard pass to make it 20–10.  After a failed fake punt attempt by the Steelers in the fourth, Murray found David Johnson on a 24-yard pass to make it 20–17.  The Steelers moved slightly ahead when Boswell kicked a 25-yard field goal to make it 23–17.  The Cards got the ball back.  Murray would be sacked before a penalty on the Steelers for going offsides.  Failing to convert the 3rd down, on 4th down, Murray took a shot down the field to get intercepted by Joe Haden, sealing the win for the Steelers. For the 6th time in 15 years, the Steelers were also denied of a possible losing season for the first time since 2003.

With the win, the Steelers improved to 8–5.

Week 15: vs. Buffalo Bills

After another tough win, the Steelers went home for a game against the Bills.  After a scoreless first quarter, the Bills scored first in the second when Josh Allen ran for a 1-yard touchdown to make it 7–0.  Chris Boswell was able to get the Steelers on the board before halftime when he kicked a 49-yard field goal to make it 7–3.  In the third quarter, the Steelers moved into the lead when Devlin Hodges found James Conner on an 11-yard pass to make it 10–7 for the quarter's only score.  The Bills would tie the game up and then take the lead in the fourth when Stephen Hauschka kicked a 36-yard field goal to make it 10–10 followed by Josh Allen finding Tyler Kroft on a 14-yard pass to make it 17–10.  The Steelers had two straight chances to move down the field and tie the game. But Hodges would be intercepted both times. The second interception sealed the loss for the Steelers.

With the loss, the Steelers fell to 8–6. The team also suffered their first-ever loss while wearing their color rush jerseys.

Week 16: at New York Jets

After losing their last game of the season at home, the Steelers traveled to take on the Jets. In the first quarter the Jets scored when Sam Darnold found Robby Anderson on a 23-yard pass to make it 7–0. They would make it 10–0 after Sam Ficken kicked a 54-yard field goal. After Chris Boswell kicked a 49-yard field goal to make it 10–3, Mason Rudolph found Diontae Johnson on a 29-yard pass to tie the game at 10–10. In the second half, it was all Jets—in the third quarter, Ficken kicked a 37-yard field goal to make it 13–10. In the fourth, the Jets increased their lead when Ficken kicked a 42-yard field goal to make it 16–10. When the Steelers got the ball back, they were unable to complete the comeback, sealing another loss.

With the loss, the Steelers fell to 8–7. They were also overtaken by the Tennessee Titans for the sixth seed in the AFC due to tiebreakers.

Week 17: at Baltimore Ravens

The Steelers ended their season on the road for Round 2 against the Ravens.  On a rain soaked field, with Robert Griffin III at quarterback, the Ravens kept the ball on the ground for their first drive.  The drive covered 40 yards, took 7 minutes off the clock and culminated with a 45-yard  Justin Tucker field goal.  After the Ravens defense forced a three-and-out, the Ravens offense, highlighted by a Gus Edwards 38-yard run, drove down the field again, this time settling for a Tucker 22-yard field goal. The Steelers took the lead early in the second quarter after a Benny Snell 4-yard touchdown run. The Ravens regained the lead, 9–7, with another Tucker field goal with 1:10 remaining in the half. The Ravens got the ball back with 54 seconds left in the half when Matthew Judon sacked Steeler quarterback Devlin Hodges forcing him to fumble. Justice Hill's 8-yard touchdown run capped a Ravens 23-yard drive and the half ended with the Ravens leading 16–7. After the teams exchanged field goals, the Ravens defense, late in the fourth quarter, stripped the ball from Steeler's punter Jordan Berry and recovered it in the end zone for a touchdown. On the next Steelers possession the Ravens were awarded 2 points after Hodges was called for intentional grounding in the end zone, making the final score 28–10.

With the loss, the Steelers finished their season 8–8 and were eliminated from playoff contention. They were also swept by the Ravens for the first time since 2015.

Standings

Division

Conference

References

External links 
 2019 Pittsburgh Steelers season statistics at Pro Football Reference 
 2019 Pittsburgh Steelers season statistics at jt-sw.com

External links

Pittsburgh
Pittsburgh Steelers seasons
Pittsburgh Steelers
2010s in Pittsburgh